Stefan Koch (born 24 April 1964) is a former German professional basketball coach.

As head coach of the Skyliners Frankfurt, he won the 2000 German Basketball Cup and, at the end of the season, was elected as Germany’s coach of the year.

In later stages of his career, he was head coach of the Baskets Würzburg.

Since autumn 2014 he has been commentator, expert and columnist for Telekom basketball.

References

External links
Official website
Eurobasket.com Profile

1964 births
Living people
German basketball coaches
People from Lich, Germany
Sportspeople from Giessen (region)
Skyliners Frankfurt coaches